Chicago Engineering Design Team (EDT) is an interdisciplinary engineering and robotics organization made up of students from the University of Illinois at Chicago (UIC). It was founded in 2000 by a small group of students that wanted to use the knowledge attained in the classroom in the field of theoretical and applied robotics. EDT is divided into three major teams, electrical, software, and mechanical, that aim to bring robotic engineering to the next level. The organization participates in robotics competitions, organizes various engineering events at UIC, and promotes Science, Technology, Engineering, and Mathematics (STEM) to the community through outreach events.

Competitions
Chicago EDT competes in three major robotics competitions, the  Intelligent Ground Vehicle Competition (IGVC), the NASA Robotic Mining Competition (RMC), and the Midwestern Robotics Design Competition (MRDC). IGVC is an international contest in which teams from different universities build robots that can autonomously navigate an obstacle course. Each team requires expertise in electrical, software, and mechanical engineering. RMC is a competition in which teams are tasked to design and construct an excavation robot to collect "lunar dust." Teams are given the option of manual control or autonomy. MRDC is a competition where teams of engineering students must build a robot which completes objectives in order to score points. This competition also has significant combat between robots, and it requires strategy and skill, in addition to a good design, in order to be successful.

In preparation for MRDC in March, teams begin the design process in the fall prior to competition. Construction of the robots can begin any time, but usually begin January before the competition. A UIC senior on the team noted that the team members were, "putting in over 20 hours a week," in addition to schoolwork.

Robots
The team has developed and competed with the following robots:

Retired
 Achilles 
 Ares 
 Enyo  
 Kratos 
 Kronos 
 Loki 
 Odin 
 Bob 
 Scarab 
 Thor 
 Lamashtu

Active
 Scipio 
 Richard
 GlaDOS 
 Hushpuppy 
 Pandora

Notable Achievements
Chicago EDT has received a reputation for well built robots. Some of their achievements are:

 2002 Fourth place overall at the JSDC
 2004 Participation in the JSDC
 2005 Most Creative award at the JSDC for the robot Ares
 2006 First place overall at the JSDC for the robot Ares
 2006 Most Innovative award at the JSDC for the robot Thor for being the only autonomous robot to score points
 2007 Third place overall at the JSDC for the robot Thor
 2007 Fourth place overall at the JSDC for the robot Ares
 2007 Second place in design competition at the IGVC for the robot Achilles
 2008 First place overall at the JSDC for the robot Ares
 2008 Fourth place overall at the JSDC for the robot Thor
 2009 Second place overall at the JSDC for the robot Kronos
 2009 Winner of the demolition round at the JSDC for the robot Odin
 2012 First and second-place winner for Sephiroth and Raijin, respectively, and demolition champion for Raijin at JSDC 
 2013 First place winner, team Thanatos. Demolition winner team Lamashtu.
 2014

JSDC:
First Place Winner, Team Richard - Awarded "Most Single Round Points Score"
Third Place Winner, Team GlaDos - Awarded "Most Minimalist" 
RMC:
First Time Competitor, 17th out of 36
IGVC:
2nd Place in design
 2019 Second place overall at MRDC for the robot Stella

References

External links
 Chicago EDT Official Site

Robotics organizations